Donja Podgorja is a settlement in the Municipality of Mrkonjic Grad of the Republika Srpska Entity in Bosnia and Herzegovina.

Name 
Donja Podgorja derives from the combined words of Pod (under) and Gora (hill or mountain) translating to a settlement under a mountain.

Demographics 
According to the 1991 census, the village had a total of 64 inhabitants. Ethnic groups in the village include:

 Serbs: 64 (100%)

According to the 2013 census, the village had a total of 12 inhabitants. Ethnic groups in the village include:

 Serbs 12 (100%)

References

Notes

Bibliography 

 

Populated places in Republika Srpska